Grega Bole (born 13 August 1985 in Jesenice, Yugoslavia) is a Slovenian professional road bicycle racer, who most recently rode for UCI WorldTeam . He held on as the field was closing in rapidly, with only Simon Gerrans who was second on the day being awarded the same time as Bole. In 2015, Bole was the victor of the first stage of the inaugural Tour of Croatia after negotiating a series of bends where two crashes occurred.

Major results

2003
 1st Overall Tour of Croatia Juniors
1st Stages 2 & 3
 7th Road race, UCI Junior Road World Championships
2005
 2nd Trofeo Banca Popolare di Vicenza
 10th Overall Okolo Slovenska
2006
 National Under-23 Road Championships
1st  Road race
3rd Time trial
 5th Overall Istrian Spring Trophy
 5th Overall Giro delle Regioni
 5th GP Kranj
 8th Gran Premio della Liberazione
 9th Overall The Paths of King Nikola
1st Stage 1
 9th Overall Okolo Slovenska
1st Stage 2
2007
 1st Liège–Bastogne–Liège Espoirs
 Giro del Friuli-Venezia Giulia
1st Points classification
1st Stage 1
 Giro delle Regioni
1st Points classification
1st Stage 2
 2nd Overall Istrian Spring Trophy
1st Stage 1
 2nd Trofeo Banca Popolare di Vicenza
 2nd Poreč Trophy
 10th Time trial, UEC European Under-23 Road Championships
2008
 1st GP Kranj
 2nd Overall Giro della Provincia di Grosseto
 7th Overall Tour of Slovenia
 7th Giro d'Oro
2009
 1st Gran Premio Nobili Rubinetterie
 1st Stage 3a Vuelta a Asturias
 2nd Overall Tour of Hainan
1st Stage 7
 2nd Giro del Friuli
 3rd Ronde van Drenthe
 3rd Prague–Karlovy Vary–Prague
 5th GP Kranj
 6th Overall Giro di Sardegna
 8th Overall Giro della Provincia di Grosseto
 9th Vuelta a La Rioja
2010
 1st Stage 1 Critérium du Dauphiné
 2nd Overall Tour de Pologne
 9th Overall Tour of Slovenia
1st Stages 1 & 2
2011
 1st  Road race, National Road Championships
 1st GP Ouest–France
 6th Giro del Friuli
 9th Vattenfall Cyclassics
2013
 1st Stage 2 Tour de l'Ain
 3rd Roma Maxima
2014
 Tour of Qinghai Lake
1st Stages 6 & 10
 Tour de Korea
1st  Sprints classification
1st Stage 1
 1st Stage 1 Szlakiem Grodów Piastowskich
 2nd Overall Circuit des Ardennes
1st  Points classification
1st Stage 3
 2nd Overall Tour of Japan
1st  Points classification
 2nd Giro dell'Appennino
 2nd Coppa Ugo Agostoni
 2nd Memorial Marco Pantani
 3rd Japan Cup
2015
 4th GP Ouest–France
 5th Gran Premio Nobili Rubinetterie
 5th Memorial Marco Pantani
 7th Overall Dubai Tour
 7th Trofeo Serra de Tramuntana
 8th Clásica de Almería
 10th Overall Tour of Croatia
1st Stage 1
2016
 1st  Overall Tour de Korea
 1st Gran Premio della Costa Etruschi
 3rd Trofeo Laigueglia
 5th Coppa Ugo Agostoni
2017
 2nd Road race, National Road Championships
2018
 1st  Mountains classification Tour of Turkey
 5th Overall Tour of Japan
1st  Points classification
1st Stages 3 & 7
 6th Eschborn–Frankfurt
2019
 10th Eschborn–Frankfurt
2022
 1st  Overall Tour of Sharjah
1st  Points classification
1st Stage 3

Grand Tour general classification results timeline

Notes

References

External links

Grega Bole's profile on Cycling Base 

1985 births
Living people
Slovenian male cyclists
Cyclists at the 2012 Summer Olympics
Olympic cyclists of Slovenia
Sportspeople from Jesenice, Jesenice